Komati-palli is a village and Gram panchayat in Dattirajeru mandal of Vizianagaram district in Andhra Pradesh, India.

Demographics
 census, the demographic details of this villages is as follows:
 Total Population: 	1,149 in 268 Households.
 Male Population: 	579
 Female Population: 	570
 Children Under 6-years of age: 154 (Boys - 73 and Girls - 81)
 Total Literates: 	448

See also 
Bobbili mandal

References

Villages in Vizianagaram district